The 2006 Florida gubernatorial election took place on November 7, 2006. Incumbent Republican Governor Jeb Bush was term-limited, and could not run for reelection to a third consecutive term. The election was won by then-Republican Charlie Crist, the state's Attorney General. The election was notable in that for the first time, the state elected a Republican governor in three consecutive elections.

Turnout for the 2006 election was down 8.5% from 2002 and down 2.7% from 1998. With Republicans holding the seat, the state avoided the wave in which Democrats netted a gain of six governorships across the nation. This remains the last time that Charlie Crist won a statewide election in Florida as well as the last election Crist competed in as a Republican.

Democratic primary

Campaign
Jim Davis won the Democratic primary on September 5. Davis was the Congressman from Florida's 11th congressional district and served in the Florida House of Representatives, where he also served as the Majority Leader. On September 13, Davis selected former State Senator and 2002 gubernatorial candidate Daryl Jones of Miami as his running mate.

The Democratic primary turned heated as it approached primary day. Rod Smith attacked Jim Davis for a 1990 legislative vote denying restitution for two black men wrongfully imprisoned for murder. Davis countered that Smith was a "pawn" of the sugar industry, and that "big business" and special interests were funding many of Smith's attack ads.

Candidates

Declared
 Jim Davis, U.S. Representative
Rod Smith, state senator
Carol Castagnero, retired teacher
Glenn Burkett
John M. Crotty

Withdrew
Bud Chiles, son of former Governor Lawton Chiles
 Scott Maddox, former Mayor of Tallahassee and former Chairman of the Florida Democratic Party

Declined
 Betty Castor, former Education Commissioner of Florida, former President of the University of South Florida, 2004 Democratic nominee for the U.S. Senate

Endorsements

Republican primary
Charlie Crist, the Republican candidate, won the primary on September 5 with 64% of the vote. Crist was Florida's Attorney General at the time.  Previously he was elected State Education Commissioner, and has served in the Florida Senate.  He faced Bob Graham for his seat in the United States Senate in 1998.  On September 13, 2006, Crist announced that State Representative Jeff Kottkamp of Cape Coral would be his running mate.

The GOP primary did not end up being very competitive. Crist touted experience in statewide offices, and a strong fundraising capability. He portrayed himself as relatively moderate on social issues, which created some misgivings among conservative Republicans in the state, but not nearly enough to sway the vote to Tom Gallagher.

Candidates

Declared
Charlie Crist, Attorney General of Florida, and nominee for U.S. Senate in 1998
Tom Gallagher, Chief Financial Officer of Florida, former State Treasurer-Insurance Commissioner, former Education Commissioner, and candidate for Governor in 1986 and 1994
Vernon Palmer
Michael W. St. Jean, minister

Declined
Toni Jennings, Lieutenant Governor of Florida

Endorsements

General election

Candidates
Charlie Crist, Florida Attorney General (Republican nominee)
Jim Davis, United States Representative from Florida's 11th congressional district (Democratic nominee)
Max Linn, financial planner (Reform Party nominee)
John Wayne Smith, perennial candidate (No Party Affiliation)
Richard Paul Dembinsky, perennial candidate (No Party Affiliation)
Karl C.C. Behm, paintball facility owner (No Party Affiliation)

Predictions

Opinion polling

General election results
Charlie Crist won by over 7 points, winning all Republican-leaning areas of Florida, as well as the notable "swing" region along the I-4 corridor (Daytona Beach, Orlando, Tampa/St. Petersburg). Davis performed well in the Democrat-leaning south Florida, Gainesville, and Tallahassee areas. Crist under-performed compared to his predecessor Jeb Bush, but still outpaced Davis, despite the low turnout. Reform Party candidate Max Linn received nearly 2% of the vote, but his sizeable haul of over 92,500 votes was still not enough to sway the election.  Crist also won 18% of the African American electorate, which outpaced previous Republicans' efforts in attracting this voting bloc in statewide elections.

Also on the ballot the same day was a constitutional amendment to raise the requirement for all future  ballot initiatives to a supermajority (60%). Previously, constitutional amendments put on the ballot required only a simple majority (50% +1) to be approved, and led to some controversial amendments being put on the ballot. Support and opposition for the amendment fell loosely along party lines with Democrats generally opposing its passage. Both Crist and Davis publicly opposed the measure, but it was passed anyway by the voters with a 55% margin - a higher margin than either candidate received.

See also
2006 United States gubernatorial elections
Governor of Florida
List of governors of Florida
2006 United States Senate election in Florida

References

External links 
Official campaign websites (Archived)
Charlie Crist for Governor
Jim Davis for Governor
Max Linn for Governor
Atlee Yarrow for Governor
Piotr Blass for Governor

2006
Governor
Florida